Rezovski Creek ( \'re-zov-ski po-'tok\) is a meltwater stream located on Livingston Island, Antarctica.

The  stream drains that portion of the northwestern slope of the Balkan Snowfield between Hesperides Hill, Atlantic Club Ridge, Krum Rock and Sinemorets Hill on Hurd Peninsula in eastern Livingston Island, South Shetland Islands in Antarctica. The arms of Rezovski Creek encompass the old buildings of the Bulgarian Base. Its lower course forms Grand Lagoon, and it has its mouth at the southwest extremity of Bulgarian Beach, which is used as an embarkation place servicing St. Kliment Ohridski Base.

A name of national geography, Rezovska is a river in southeastern Bulgaria. The name was established in use at the time of approval.

Location

Maps 
 Isla Livingston: Península Hurd. Mapa topográfico de escala 1:25000. Madrid: Servicio Geográfico del Ejército, 1991. (Map reproduced on p. 16 of the linked work)
 L.L. Ivanov. St. Kliment Ohridski Base, Livingston Island. Scale 1:1000 topographic map. Sofia: Antarctic Place-names Commission of Bulgaria, 1996. (The first Bulgarian Antarctic topographic map, in Bulgarian)
 L.L. Ivanov et al. Antarctica: Livingston Island and Greenwich Island, South Shetland Islands. Scale 1:100000 topographic map. Sofia: Antarctic Place-names Commission of Bulgaria, 2005.
 L.L. Ivanov. Antarctica: Livingston Island and Greenwich, Robert, Snow and Smith Islands. Scale 1:120000 topographic map.  Troyan: Manfred Wörner Foundation, 2009.  
 Antarctica, South Shetland Islands, Livingston Island: Bulgarian Antarctic Base. Sheets 1 and 2. Scale 1:2000 topographic map. Geodesy, Cartography and Cadastre Agency, 2016. (in Bulgarian)
 Antarctic Digital Database (ADD). Scale 1:250000 topographic map of Antarctica. Scientific Committee on Antarctic Research (SCAR). Since 1993, regularly upgraded and updated.
 L.L. Ivanov. Antarctica: Livingston Island and Smith Island. Scale 1:100000 topographic map. Manfred Wörner Foundation, 2017.

References
 Rezovski Creek. SCAR Composite Antarctic Gazetteer
 Bulgarian Antarctic Gazetteer. Antarctic Place-names Commission. (details in Bulgarian, basic data in English)

Bodies of water of Livingston Island
Rivers of Antarctica
Bodies of water of the South Shetland Islands